The 1960 The Citadel Bulldogs football team represented The Citadel, The Military College of South Carolina in the 1960 NCAA University Division football season. The Bulldogs were led by fourth-year head coach Eddie Teague and played their home games at Johnson Hagood Stadium. They played as members of the Southern Conference, as they have since 1936. In 1960, The Citadel won in its first and only bowl appearance in the Tangerine Bowl.

Schedule

Game summaries

Newberry

George Washington

Davidson

Florida State

Richmond

Furman

Presbyterian

William & Mary

VMI

Arkansas State

Tennessee Tech

NFL Draft selections

AFL Draft selections

References

Citadel
The Citadel Bulldogs football seasons
Citrus Bowl champion seasons
Citadel football